Jewish Communist Party (Poalei Zion) (Evreĭskaia kommunisticheskaia partiia (Poaleĭ-Tsion), abbreviated EKP) was a political party in Russia 1919-1922. The party was formed at a conference of communist dissident fractions of the Jewish Social Democratic Labour Party (Poalei Zion), held in Gomel August 10-15, 1919. Members of the party were nick-named 'EKOP-ists'. It was affiliated to the Jewish Communist Union (Poalei Zion).

History
EKP argued in favour of a merger with the Bund, to form a Jewish section of the Communist International. The proposed Jewish Comintern section would work under the aegis of the national communist party in each country, apart from Palestine. EKP was fiercely opposed to the Yevsektsiya, the Jewish Section of the Russian Communist Party (Bolsheviks).

The II All-Russian conference of the EKP was held in July 1920 in Kharkov. The IV Congress of was held in August 1921 and the III All-Russian conference was held 1-2 December 1922 in Moscow.

The party was represented in the Council for Propaganda and Action of the Peoples of the East of the Communist International through Zajma Ostrovsky, who participated in the 1920 Congress of the Peoples of the East, held in Baku, Azerbaijan (part of Soviet Russia).

In its later phase the party passed through severe internal disputes. The fact that the Komfarband merged with RCP(b) in March 1921 weakened the case for the formation of a Jewish Comintern section and sparked a debate on RCP(b)-EKP merger within the party.

In 1922 the party merged into the Russian Communist Party (bolsheviks) and many of its members became involved in the Yevsektsiya.

In Baku
The EKP occupied a strong position in Baku after the arrival of the 11th Soviet Red Army. The Jewish population of the city grew considerably in those years because of the pogroms committed by the White Army in Ukraine, Belarus and Russia that led many Jews to find shelter in Azerbaijan, a country without an antisemitic tradition. The fact that the Jewish population had grown up to 13,700 persons helped the EKP (as well as the Communist Bund, the Yevsektsiya and the Zionist parties) to enlarge its membership in the area. The EKP promoted many cultural activities and struggled for the eliminination of illiteracy, in particular among the Mountain Jews. In 1921 the betsalel circles were opened in Baku. In those places it was possible to organize literature and Jewish drama courses.

Organization
The party was led by a Central Committee and a Politburo. The organ of the Central Committee of EKP was Nakanune ('Накануне'). In Ukraine, the party Central Committee had a Right-bank Bureau (Pravbirou) and a Left-bank Bureau. The Belorussian EKP was headed by a Chief Committee. Moreover, the party had a Caucasus Regional Committee. The youth wing of the party was called Jewish Communist Youth Union.

EKP maintained a party school in Kharkov, named after Ber Borochov.

Local organs of the party
Minsk: Budil'nik (in Yiddish)
Poltava: Ekapistskaia khronika (in Yiddish)
Kiev: Kommunisticheskaia mysl΄ (in Yiddish)
Moscow: Kommunisticheskaia mysl΄ (in Yiddish)
Nezhin: Kommunisticheskoe slovo (organ of the Pravbiuro)
Yaroslavl: Na strazhe
Avangard (organ of the Chief Committee of the Belorussian EKP)
Molot (organ of the Chief Committee of the Belorussian EKP)

See also
 Jewish Communist Labour Party (Poalei Zion)
 Jewish Communist Union (Poalei Zion)
 Jewish Communist Party — Poalei Zion, section of the Palestine Communist Party
 Mifleget Poale Zion VeHaHugim HaMarksistim beEretz Yisrael
 Poale Zion

References

Poale Zion
Political parties of the Russian Revolution
Defunct communist parties in Russia
Jewish political parties
Jewish communist movements
Jews and Judaism in the Soviet Union
Political parties established in 1919
Defunct communist parties in Ukraine
Political parties of minorities in Russia
Secular Jewish culture in Europe